German submarine U-708 was a Type VIIC U-boat of Nazi Germany's Kriegsmarine during World War II.
Ordered 6 August 1940, she was laid down 31 March 1941 and launched 24 March 1942. She was used only for training, and was captained by four different commanders during her 3-year life. 
She was scuttled on 5 May 1945 at Wilhelmshaven and her wreck was broken up in 1947.

Design
German Type VIIC submarines were preceded by the shorter Type VIIB submarines. U-708 had a displacement of  when at the surface and  while submerged. She had two shafts and two  propellers.

U-708 was fitted with five  torpedo tubes (four fitted at the bow and one at the stern), fourteen torpedoes, one  SK C/35 naval gun, 220 rounds, and two twin  C/30 anti-aircraft guns. The boat had a complement of between forty-four and sixty.

References

Bibliography

External links

German Type VIIC submarines
U-boats commissioned in 1942
1941 ships
World War II submarines of Germany
Ships built in Hamburg
World War II shipwrecks in the Atlantic Ocean
Operation Regenbogen (U-boat)
Maritime incidents in May 1945